Roberta Alaimo is an Italian politician. She was elected to be a deputy to the Parliament of Italy in the 2018 Italian general election for the Legislature XVIII of Italy.

Career
Alaimo was born on April 1, 1979 in Corleone.

She was elected to the Italian Parliament in the 2018 Italian general election, to represent the district of Sicily 1 for the Five Star Movement.

References

Living people
Five Star Movement politicians
1979 births
Politicians from Corleone
21st-century Italian women politicians
Deputies of Legislature XVIII of Italy
Women members of the Chamber of Deputies (Italy)